The 2018 F4 Spanish Championship was the third season of the Spanish F4 Championship. It was a multi-event motor racing championship for open wheel, formula racing cars regulated according to FIA Formula 4 regulations, taking place in Spain. The championship featured drivers competing in 1.4 litre Tatuus-Abarth single seat race cars that conformed to the technical regulations for the championship. The series was organised by RFEDA.

Entry list

Race calendar

The provisional calendar was announced on 23 November 2017. An updated version of the calendar was released on 23 January 2018, with changes applied to Jerez round date.

On 1 June, it was announced the organizers cancelled round 2 at the Circuito del Jarama in Madrid due to lack of entries.

Championship standings
Points were awarded to the top ten classified finishers in races 1 and 3 and for the top eight classified finishers in race 2. No points were awarded for pole position or fastest lap.

Drivers' championship 

Notes:
† — Drivers did not finish the race, but were classified as they completed over 75% of the race distance.

Teams' championship

Galfer Trophy 
Trophy for the fastest laps during the race.

Notes

References

External links
 

Spanish F4 Championship seasons
Spanish F4
F4 Spanish Championship
Spanish F4